The World Wide Fund for Nature Inc. (WWF) is a Swiss-based  international non-governmental organization founded in 1961 that works in the field of wilderness preservation and the reduction of human impact on the environment. It was formerly named the World Wildlife Fund, which remains its official name in Canada and the United States.

WWF is the world's largest conservation organization, with over five million supporters worldwide, working in more than 100 countries and supporting around 3,000 conservation and environmental projects. They have invested over $1 billion in more than 12,000 conservation initiatives since 1995. WWF is a foundation with 65% of funding from individuals and bequests, 17% from government sources (such as the World Bank, DFID, and USAID) and 8% from corporations in 2020.

WWF aims to "stop the degradation of the planet's natural environment and to build a future in which humans live in harmony with nature." The Living Planet Report has been published every two years by WWF since 1998; it is based on a Living Planet Index and ecological footprint calculation. In addition, WWF has launched several notable worldwide campaigns, including Earth Hour and Debt-for-nature swap, and its current work is organized around these six areas: food, climate, freshwater, wildlife, forests, and oceans.

WWF received criticism for its alleged corporate ties and has been reprimanded for supporting eco-guards that hounded African forest dwellers in the proposed Messok Dja national park in the Republic of the Congo.

WWF is part of the Steering Group of the Foundations Platform F20, an international network of foundations and philanthropic organizations.

History

Founding 

The idea for a fund on behalf of endangered animals was officially proposed by Victor Stolan to Sir Julian Huxley in response to articles he published in the British newspaper The Observer. This proposal led Huxley to put Stolan in contact with Edward Max Nicholson, a person who had had thirty years experience of linking progressive intellectuals with big business interests through the Political and Economic Planning think tank. Nicholson thought up the name of the organization and the original panda logo was designed by Sir Peter Scott. WWF was conceived on 29 April 1961, under the name of World Wildlife Fund. Its first office was opened on 11 September in IUCN's headquarters at Morges, Switzerland.

The WWF was conceived to act as an international fundraising organisation to support the work of existing conservation groups, primarily the International Union for Conservation of Nature. Its establishment was marked with the signing of the Morges Manifesto, the founding document that sets out the fund's commitment to assisting worthy organizations struggling to save the world's wildlife:

Prince Bernhard of Lippe-Biesterfeld helped to found the WWF, becoming its first president in 1961. In 1963, the Foundation held a conference and published a major report warning of anthropogenic global warming, written by Noel Eichhorn based on the work of Frank Fraser Darling (then foundation vice president), Edward Deevey, Erik Eriksson, Charles Keeling, Gilbert Plass, Lionel Walford, and William Garnett.

In 1970, along with Prince Philip, Duke of Edinburgh, and a few associates, Bernhard established the WWF's financial endowment The 1001: A Nature Trust to handle the organization's administration and fundraising. 1001 members each contributed $10,000 to the trust. Prince Bernhard resigned his post after being involved in the Lockheed Bribery Scandal.

Recent development 

The WWF has set up offices and operations around the world. It originally worked by fundraising and providing grants to existing non-governmental organizations with an initial focus on the protection of endangered species. As more resources became available, its operations expanded into other areas such as the preservation of biological diversity, sustainable use of natural resources, the reduction of pollution, and climate change. The organization also began to run its own conservation projects and campaigns.In 1986, the organization changed its name to World Wide Fund for Nature, while retaining the WWF initials. However, it continued at that time to operate under the original name in the United States and Canada.

1986 was the 25th anniversary of WWF's foundation, an event marked by a gathering in Assisi, Italy to which the organization's International President Prince Philip, the Duke of Edinburgh, invited religious authorities representing Buddhism, Christianity, Hinduism, Islam and Judaism. These leaders produced The Assisi Declarations, theological statements showing the spiritual relationship between their followers and nature that triggered a growth in the engagement of those religions with conservation around the world.

In the 1990s, WWF revised its mission statement to:

WWF researchers and many others identified 238 ecoregions that represent the world's most biologically outstanding terrestrial, freshwater and marine habitats, based on a worldwide biodiversity analysis which the organization says was the first of its kind. In the early 2000s (decade), its work was focused on a subset of these ecoregions, in the areas of forest, freshwater and marine habitat conservation, endangered species conservation, climate change, and the elimination of the most toxic chemicals.

In 1990, the Conservation Foundation was completely merged into WWF, after becoming an affiliate of WWF-US in 1985 when it became a distinct legal entity but with the same staff and board. The organization now known as the Conservation Foundation in the United States is the former Forest Foundation of DuPage County. In 1996, the organization obtained general consultative status from UNESCO.

Harvard University published a case study on WWF called "Negotiating Toward the Paris Accords: WWF & the Role of Forests in the 2015 Climate Agreement":

Panda symbol 

WWF's giant panda logo originated from a panda named Chi Chi that had been transferred from Beijing Zoo to London Zoo in 1958, three years before WWF was established. Being famous as the only panda residing in the Western world at that time, her uniquely recognisable physical features and status as an endangered species were seen as ideal to serve the organization's need for a strong recognisable symbol that would overcome all language barriers. The organization also needed an animal that would have an impact in black and white printing. The logo was then designed by Sir Peter Scott from preliminary sketches by Gerald Watterson, a Scottish naturalist.

The logo was slightly simplified and made more geometric in 1978, and was stylized and less detailed in 1986, at the time that the organization changed its name, with the new version featuring solid black shapes for eyes. In 2000 a change was made to the font used for the initials "WWF" in the logo.

Organization and operation

Policy-making
Policies of the WWF are made by board members elected for three-year terms. An Executive Team guides and develops WWF's strategy. There is also a National Council which stands as an advisory group to the board and a team of scientists and experts in conservation who research for WWF.

National and international law plays an important role in determining how habitats and resources are managed and used. Laws and regulations become one of the organization's global priorities.

The WWF has been opposed to the extraction of oil from the Canadian tar sands and has campaigned on this matter. Between 2008 and 2010 the WWF worked with The Co-operative Group, the UK's largest consumer co-operative to publish reports which concluded that: (1) exploiting the Canadian tar sands to their full potential would be sufficient to bring about what they described as 'runaway climate change; (2) carbon capture and storage (CCS) technology cannot be used to reduce the release of carbon dioxide into the atmosphere to a level comparable to that of other methods of oil extraction; (3) the $379 billion which is expected to be spent extracting oil from tar sands could be better spent on research and development in renewable energy technology; and (4) the expansion of tar sands extraction poses a serious threat to the caribou in Alberta .

The organization convinces and helps governments and other political bodies to adopt, enforce, strengthen and/or change policies, guidelines and laws that affect biodiversity and natural resource use. It also ensures government consent and/or keeps their commitment to international instruments relating to the protection of biodiversity and natural resources.

In 2012, David Nussbaum, Chief Executive of WWF-UK, spoke out against the way shale gas is used in the UK, saying: "...the Government must reaffirm its commitment to tackling climate change and prioritise renewables and energy efficiency."

Collaboration 
The organisation works on a number of global issues driving biodiversity loss and unsustainable use of natural resources, including species conservation, finance, business practices, laws, and consumption choices. Local offices also work on national or regional issues.

WWF works with a large number of different groups to achieve its goals, including other NGOs, governments, business, investment banks, scientists, fishermen, farmers and local communities. It also undertakes public campaigns to influence decision makers, and seeks to educate people on how to live in a more environmentally friendly manner. It urges people to donate funds to protect the environment. The donors can also choose to receive gifts in return.

In October 2020, WWF was named as one of the alliance partner's of Prince William's Earthshot Prize, to find solutions to environmental issues.

In March 2021, WWF announced an extension of their partnership with H&M to address sustainable supply chain practices.

List of presidents

Notable initiatives and programs

Campaigns 

Debt-for-Nature Swap
Earth Hour
Healthy Grown
Marine Stewardship Council

Publications 
WWF publishes the Living Planet Index in collaboration with the Zoological Society of London. Along with ecological footprint calculations, the Index is used to produce a bi-yearly Living Planet Report giving an overview of the impact of human activity on the world. In 2019, WWF and Knorr jointly published the Future 50 Foods report identifying "50 Foods for Healthier People and a Healthier Planet". In 2018, WWF, TRAFFIC and IFAW launched the Coalition to End Wildlife Trafficking Online with 21 tech companies.  In 2017, Instagram accounts, Sal Lavallo and Jessica Nabongo ate a trafficked, endangered pangolin at a hotel in Gabon.  There is often no penalty to social media accounts for cruelty to animals on social media platforms. 

The organization also regularly publishes reports, fact sheets and other documents on issues related to its work, to raise awareness and provide information to policy and decision makers.

Promotions 

No One's Gonna Change Our World was a charity album released in 1969, for the benefit of the WWF.
Peter Rose and Anne Conlon are music theatre writers, well known for their environmental musicals for children, who were commissioned by WWF-UK to write several environmental musicals as part of an education plan. Some were narrated by David Attenborough, and broadcast on television in numerous countries.
The British pop group S Club 7 were ambassadors for WWF-UK during their time together as a band (1999–2003). Each of the members sponsored an endangered animal, and in 2000, traveled to the various locations around the world of their chosen animals for a seven-part BBC documentary series entitled S Club 7 Go Wild.
Environmentally Sound: A Select Anthology of Songs Inspired by the Earth is a benefit album released in 2006, for WWF-Philippines, featuring artists that included Up Dharma Down, Radioactive Sago Project, Kala, Johnny Alegre Affinity, Cynthia Alexander, and Joey Ayala.
In June 2012, WWF launched an online music download store with fairsharemusic from which 50% of the profit goes to the charity.
In April 2015, Hailey Gardiner released her solo EP, titled The Woods. In honor of Earth Day, 15% of the proceeds made towards the purchase of the EP would be donated to the WWF.

Controversies and disputes

ARD documentary and PandaLeaks book 
The German public television ARD aired a documentary on 22 June 2011 that claimed to show how the WWF cooperates with corporations such as Monsanto, providing sustainability certification in exchange for donations– essentially greenwashing. WWF has denied the allegations. By encouraging high-impact eco-tourism, the program alleges that WWF contributes to the destruction of habitat and species it claims to protect while also harming indigenous peoples.

The filmmaker, German investigative journalist Wilfried Huismann, was sued by the WWF over his documentary and the book Schwarzbuch WWF published in 2012, which was based on the documentary. In an out of court settlement, he agreed to remove or revise certain claims. Speaking on behalf of WWF Germany, Marco Vollmar indicated "[Huismann] draws a distorted picture of false statements, defamations and exaggerations, but we will accept that as expressions of opinion." (Translated from the original German: "")

In 2014, Huismann published a revised edition of his 2012 book, originally called The Silence of the Pandas. The original edition had become a bestseller in Germany, but was banned from Britain until 2014, when it was released under the title of PandaLeaks – The Dark Side of the WWF, after a series of injunctions and court orders. The book criticizes WWF for its involvement with corporations that are responsible for large-scale destruction of the environment, such as Coca-Cola, and gives details into the existence of the secret 1001 Club, whose members, Huismann claims, continue to have an unhealthy influence on WWF's policy making. WWF has denied the allegations made against it.

Corporate partnerships 
WWF has been accused by the campaigner Corporate Watch of being too close to business to campaign objectively. WWF claims partnering with corporations such as Coca-Cola, Lafarge, Carlos Slim's and IKEA will reduce their effect on the environment.  WWF received €56 million (US$80 million) from corporations in 2010 (an 8% increase in support from corporations compared to 2009), accounting for 11% of total revenue for the year.

For their 2019 fiscal year, WWF reported 4% of their total operating revenue coming from corporations.

Human rights abuses by paramilitaries 
In 2017, a report by Survival International claimed that WWF-funded paramilitaries are not only committing abuses against the indigenous Baka and Bayaka in the Congo Basin, who "face harassment and beatings, torture and death", but are also corrupt and aid in the destruction of conserved areas. The report accused WWF and its guards of partnering with several logging companies who carried out deforestation, while the rangers ignored wildlife trafficking networks.

In 2019, an investigation by BuzzFeed News alleged that paramilitary groups funded by the organisation are engaged in serious human rights abuses against villagers, and the organisation has covered up the incidents and acted to protect the perpetrators from law enforcement. These armed groups were claimed to torture, sexually assault, and execute villagers based on false accusations. In one instance found by BuzzFeed News investigators, an 11-year-old boy was allegedly tortured by WWF-funded rangers in front of his parents; WWF ignored all complaints against the rangers. In another incident, a ranger attempted to rape a Tharu woman and, when she resisted, attacked her with bamboo stick until she lost consciousness. While the ranger was arrested, the woman was pressured not to press charges, resulting in the ranger going free. In 2010, WWF-sponsored rangers reportedly killed a 12-year-old girl who was collecting tree bark in Bardiya National Park. Park and WWF officials allegedly obstructed investigations in these cases, by "falsifying and destroying evidence, falsely claiming the victims were poachers, and pressuring the families of the victims to withdraw criminal complaints".

In July 2019, Buzzfeed reported that a leaked report by the WWF accused guards of beating and raping women including pregnant women while torturing men by tying their penises with fishing lines. The investigations were cut short after paramilitary groups threatened investigators with death. The investigators accused WWF of covering up the crimes. Releasing an official statement, the WWF claimed that the report was not made public to ensure the safety of the victims and that the guards were suspended and are awaiting prosecution. However Buzzfeed accused the WWF of attempting to withhold the report to the US congressional committee investigating the human rights violations by providing highly redacted versions instead.

In the Central African Republic, WWF officials were reportedly involved in an arms deal, where the organization paid for 15 Kalashnikov assault rifles and ammunition; but part of the money went unaccounted for and they were apparently defrauded by the CAR army representatives selling the weapons.

The Kathmandu Post, which cooperated with BuzzFeed News on the investigations in Nepal, claimed there was intense lobbying and political pressure to release WWF-funded rangers arrested for murder. They interviewed activists who claimed they were promised donations for pressuring victims of abuse to drop charges against the rangers. When the local Tharu community protested, WWF officials carried out a counter-protest in favour of the accused and used park elephants to block Prithvi Highway.

An investigation by Rainforest Foundation UK found evidence of widespread physical and sexual assault by 'eco-guards' employed by the Salonga National Park in the Democratic Republic of Congo funded by WWF.  These include two cases of gang rape, two extrajudicial killings, and multiple accounts of torture and other forms of mistreatment committed by park guards.

In reply to the investigations, WWF stated that it takes any allegations seriously and would be launching an independent review into the cases raised. The organisation stated it has stringent policies designed to ensure it and its partners are safeguarding the rights and well-being of indigenous peoples and local communities, and should the review uncover any breaches, it is committed to taking swift action.

These accusations were central to a four day sit-in protest carried out by members of Extinction Rebellion's XR Youth Solidarity Network at WWF-UK's headquarters in September 2021.

Initialism dispute 

In 2000, the World Wide Fund for Nature sued the World Wrestling Federation (now named WWE) for unfair trade practices. Both parties had shared the initials "WWF" since 1979. The conservation organization claimed that the professional wrestling company had violated a 1994 agreement regarding international use of the WWF initials.

On 10 August 2001, a UK court ruled in favour of the World Wide Fund for Nature. The World Wrestling Federation filed an appeal in October 2001, but later withdrew their appeal. On 5 May 2002, the World Wrestling Federation changed its Web address from WWF.com to WWE.com, and replaced every "WWF" reference on the existing site with "WWE", officially announcing their name change to "World Wrestling Entertainment" a day later with a "Get the 'F' Out" marketing campaign. The company's stock ticker also switched from WWF to WWE shortly after.

The wrestling organization's abandonment of "WWF" initialism did not end the two organizations' legal conflict. Later in 2002, the World Wide Fund for Nature petitioned the court for $360 million in damages, but was not successful. A subsequent request to overturn by the World Wide Fund for Nature was dismissed by the British Court of Appeal on 28 June 2007. In 2003, World Wrestling Entertainment won a limited decision which permitted them to continue marketing certain pre-existing products with the abandoned WWF logo. However, WWE was mandated to issue newly branded merchandise such as apparel, action figures, video games, and DVDs with the "WWE" initials. Additionally, the court order required the company to remove both auditory and visual references to "WWF" in its library of video footage outside the United Kingdom.

Starting with the 1,000th episode of Raw in July 2012, the WWF "scratch" logo is no longer censored in archival footage. In addition, the WWF initials are no longer censored when spoken or when written in plain text in archival footage.  In exchange, WWE is no longer permitted to use WWF initials or logo in any new, original footage, packaging, or advertising, with any old-school logos for retro-themed programming now using a modification of the original WWF logo without the F.

Mekong River dolphins report 
In June 2009, Touch Seang Tana, chairman of Cambodia's Commission for Conservation and Development of the Mekong River Dolphins Eco-tourism Zone, argued that the WWF had misrepresented the danger of extinction of the Mekong dolphin to boost fundraising. The report stated that the deaths were caused by a bacterial disease that became fatal due to environmental contaminants suppressing the dolphins' immune systems. He called the report unscientific and harmful to the Cambodian government and threatened WWF's Cambodian branch with suspension unless they met with him to discuss his claims. Touch Seang Tana later said he would not press charges of supplying false information and would not make any attempt to prevent WWF from continuing its work in Cambodia, but advised WWF to adequately explain its findings and check with the commission before publishing another report. Criticism of the validity of reports critical of government action or inaction, where 'approval' has not been sought before publication, is common in Cambodia.

In January 2012, Touch Seang Tana signed the "Kratie Declaration on the Conservation of the Mekong River Irrawaddy Dolphin" along with WWF and the Cambodian Fisheries Administration, an agreement binding the parties to work together on a "roadmap" addressing dolphin conservation in the Mekong River.

Accountability 

The Charity Navigator gave the WWF a 3-star overall rating, a 2-star financial rating and a 4-star accountability and transparency rating for the 2018 fiscal year.

Manipulation of CO2 emissions data from nuclear energy 
In 2009, in a scorecard report that they authored on carbon emissions in G8 countries, the WWF portrayed the greenhouse gas emissions of countries who use low-carbon nuclear power in their mix as a higher amount of emissions than realistically calculated. For example, for France, the WWF displayed a false value of 362 gCO2eq/kWh which is over 400% larger than the actual emissions in France. WWF explained the manipulation as follows:

The scorecard for Sweden was also "adjusted" in similar way, where the WWF replaced the actual emissions of 47 gCO2eq/kWh with 212 gCO2eq/kWh.

Nord Stream involvement 
In 2011 Jochen Lamp, head of WWF Germany, was also head of Conservation Foundation German Baltic, sponsored by Nord Stream AG company building a controversial gas pipeline from Russia to Germany.  While WWF headed by Lamp has been actively blocking the project using court cases, Nord Stream reached "an out-of-court agreement" with the Foundation, also headed by Lamp, involving transfer of 10 million EUR, after which WWF withdrew the case.

Controversy on investments in multiple fossil fuel developments
Investigative journalism by NBC and later Naomi Klein, in 2008 and 2013 respectively, uncovered that the WWF has invested and profits from, multi-million dollar investment contracts it has put into oil, gas, coal and tar sands developments and did not pull out of these, divesting, when confronted but indicated it would at the minimum wait until 2020 to do so, in some of its fossil fuel ventures, as early ending would have not been as profitable for them. The WWF does not oppose fossil fuels but engages in what it internally terms as the "responsible development" of fossil fuels.

Proposal to sell non-fungible tokens

In February 2022, WWF UK released plans to raise funds through selling NFTs (non-fungible tokens). NFT is a unit of data stored on a blockchain. Critics point out transacting NFTs causes significant environmental impact.

Listed as "foreign agents" in Russia 
On 10 March 2023, during the 2022 Russian invasion of Ukraine, WWF was listed as a "foreign agent" in Russia, for having tried to influence the Russian authorities "under the guise of protecting nature and the environment".

Regional organisations

WWF-Australia
, WWF-Australia is the country's biggest conservation organisation, which operates projects throughout Australia as well as the wider Oceania region. Between 2015 and 2019 WWF-Australia reported an average revenue of $28.74 million per year. In 2020, WWF-Australia reported a total revenue of over $80 million driven by the global & local response to the Australian bushfires.

In 1990, WWF-Australia established the national Threatened Species Network (TSN) with the federal government, which remained operational until 2009. In 1999 it participated in the creation of the Environment Protection and Biodiversity Conservation Act, at that time the most encompassing biodiversity conservation laws in the world. In 2003/4 the organisation played a part in getting the government to raise the level of protection for the Great Barrier Reef and the Ningaloo Reef, and since then has participated in or managed many conservation programs, such as the reintroduction of black-flanked rock-wallabies to Kalbarri National Park in Western Australia.

Fundación Vida Silvestre Argentina

In Argentina, WWF is represented by Fundación Vida Silvestre Argentina, an independent organization which is also a part of the network.

See also 

Centres of Plant Diversity
Conservation movement
Environmental Dispute Resolution Fund
Environmental movement
Eugene Green Energy Standard, founded by the WWF.
Global 200, ecoregions identified by the WWF as priorities for conservation
List of environmental organizations
Natural environment
Sustainability
Sustainable development
Traffic (conservation programme), a joint programme of WWF and the International Union for Conservation of Nature (IUCN)
West Coast Environmental Law
World Conservation Award, created in conjunction with the WWF
WWE, formerly named WWF (World Wrestling Federation)

References

External links 

 (WWF International website)
World Wildlife Fund, WWF-US Website.
.
WWF's global network

WWF Armenia
 WWF-Pakistan
WWF-India
WWF Guianas
WWF Russia

 
International environmental organizations
Nature conservation organisations based in Europe
Ecology organizations
Wildlife conservation organizations
Environmental organizations established in 1961
Organizations established in 1961
Non-profit organisations based in Pakistan
Non-profit organisations based in Switzerland
Non-profit organisations based in the United Kingdom
Non-profit organizations based in the United States
1961 establishments in Switzerland